Death in the Hopfields is a 1937 detective novel by John Rhode, the pen name of the British writer Cecil Street. It is the twenty fifth in his long-running series of novels featuring Lancelot Priestley, a Golden Age armchair detective. It was published in America by Dodd Mead under the alternative title The Harvest Murder.

Caldwell Harpur gave the novel a broadly positive review in the Times Literary Supplement but felt that the murder mystery was so simple that there had really been no need for the local police to need assistance to crack the case.

Synopsis
The novel takes place in rural Kent during the hop-picking season. A burglary takes place and the complex circumstances surrounding it lead to Sergeant Wragge of the local force calling in Scotland Yard. It is only through the deductions of Priestley, however, that it is realised that his is a case of murder.

References

Bibliography
 Evans, Curtis. Masters of the "Humdrum" Mystery: Cecil John Charles Street, Freeman Wills Crofts, Alfred Walter Stewart and the British Detective Novel, 1920-1961. McFarland, 2014.
 Herbert, Rosemary. Whodunit?: A Who's Who in Crime & Mystery Writing. Oxford University Press, 2003.
 Reilly, John M. Twentieth Century Crime & Mystery Writers. Springer, 2015.

1937 British novels
Novels by Cecil Street
British crime novels
British mystery novels
British thriller novels
British detective novels
Collins Crime Club books
Novels set in Kent